Wachirakrit Pugpobsook or Klui (born January 27, 1982) is a Thai singer from GMM Grammy.

Klui was born in Songkla and lived in Chiang Mai. After he graduated at Mattayom 6 Klui studied photography in Japan at Tokyo Visual Arts College.

Klui returned to Thailand to join Sanamlaung Music of GMM Grammy.

Singles 

 2006 "Ther Thao-nan" Album Behind the Song by En Phiyada Lucks Music
 2007 "Maimeesith", "Rak leklek" Ost. World 2 
 2009 "Why must love you Romantic Version" featuring En Phiyada

Remember Band 

 2010 "Ja-Mai Tham"

Sanamlaung Music 

 2013 "Ja Tong Mee Sak Klung Si"
 2014 "Cross Love" (Japanese Pop Version) featuring Lula (Ost. The Rising Sun)

Host 
 Malang Wan 
 Live@G
 Take a Walk

References

External links 
 

Wachirakrit Pugpobsook
1982 births
Living people
Wachirakrit Pugpobsook